Hussain Mohamed Hassan (born 25 April 1971) is an Egyptian field hockey player. He competed in the men's tournament at the 1992 Summer Olympics.

References

External links
 

1971 births
Living people
Egyptian male field hockey players
Olympic field hockey players of Egypt
Field hockey players at the 1992 Summer Olympics
Place of birth missing (living people)